George Mourad (born 18 September 1982) is a former professional footballer who played as a striker. Mourad represented both Sweden and Syria internationally.

Club career
After playing for Västra Frölunda IF, he joined IFK Göteborg in 2004 and scored seven goals in his debut season in Allsvenskan. In 2005, he had a disappointing season with only three goals in Allsvenskan. He then signed a six-month loan contract for Italian Serie B side Brescia on 31 January 2006. After a trial, Mourad was granted a contract on 11 January 2008 at the Dutch club Willem II. He has played for the Sweden national football team. As of 1 February 2010, Mourad left Willem II after dissolving his contract.
Mourad signed a one-year contract with Tromsø IL on 11 March 2010.

Mourad transferred to Chinese Super League side Qingdao Jonoon in February 2013.

International career
Mourad was born in Lebanon, and is of Assyrian descent, but was raised in Sweden. He played for Swedish youth teams, and a friendly for the Sweden national football team, before switching to the Syrian Arab Federation for Football.

He played his first official cap in the 2014 FIFA World Cup qualification tournament for Syria against Tajikistan on 23 July 2011, thereby eliminating the possibility of playing for Sweden ever again. His international debut for the Syrian national team was in a friendly against Iraq in Arbil on 29 June 2011.

In a controversial decision, FIFA disqualified Syria from the 2014 World Cup qualifiers for fielding Mourad, who previously represented Sweden in a U-21 UEFA qualifying tournament in 2003, without seeking the administrative approval of FIFA for the switch. Tajikistan replaced Syria in the 2014 World Cup qualifiers as of 19 August 2011. Syrian Arab Federation for Football president Farouq Sarriyeh announced he would petition CAS to overturn the FIFA ban.

Career statistics

International 
Scores and results list Syria's goal tally first, score column indicates score after each Mourad goal.

References

External links
 
 

1982 births
Living people
Footballers from Beirut
Syrian footballers
Syria international footballers
Swedish footballers
Sweden international footballers
Assyrian footballers
Assyrian/Syriac Syrians
Syrian expatriate footballers
Syrian emigrants to Sweden
Västra Frölunda IF players
IFK Göteborg players
Brescia Calcio players
Tromsø IL players
Portimonense S.C. players
Willem II (football club) players
Utsiktens BK players
Allsvenskan players
Eredivisie players
Serie B players
Primeira Liga players
Persian Gulf Pro League players
Sanat Mes Kerman F.C. players
Qingdao Hainiu F.C. (1990) players
Örgryte IS players
Chinese Super League players
Expatriate footballers in Italy
Expatriate footballers in the Netherlands
Expatriate footballers in Portugal
Expatriate footballers in Iran
Expatriate footballers in China
Expatriate footballers in Norway
Syrian Christians
Association football forwards
Dual internationalists (football)